Stephen Leeder AO FRACP FFPH FAFPHM FRACGP (born 13 December 1941 in Grafton, New South Wales) is an emeritus professor of public health and community medicine at the University of Sydney, where he was dean of medicine from 1997 to 2002. Leeder is an adjunct professor of public health at the Western Sydney University, an adjunct professor of epidemiology at the Columbia University Mailman School of Public Health in New York.  He held the position as chair of the Western Sydney Local Health District Board from 2011-2016. 

Leeder was editor-in-chief of The Medical Journal of Australia until he was fired in 2015 for criticizing the decision to outsource its production to Elsevier. All but three of the MJA's editorial advisory committee resigned after the decision to fire Leeder, and the dissidents wrote to Australian Medical Association president Brian Owler asking him to review the decision. Ken Harvey supported Leeder, saying that his firing and the use of Elsevier "is a mistake that is fairly irredeemable". On 1 January 2017, Leeder became editor-in-chief of the International Journal of Epidemiology.

Education 
Leeder attended Homebush Boys High School and the University of Sydney, where he graduated with honours in medical science in 1964; in medicine in 1966; as a Doctor of Philosophy in 1974 (his dissertation was entitled, "An epidemiological study of selected factors which may pre-dispose to chronic obstructive lung disease"), and as a Doctor of Medicine in 2006 (his dissertation was entitled, "Studies of factors that affect the lung function of children").

Career 
Leeder began his career as an intern at Royal North Shore Hospital in North Sydney in 1966.

Leeder has a history of involvement in public-health research, educational development and policy. His research interests as a clinical epidemiologist have been primarily asthma and cardiovascular disease. Leeder's interest in public health was piqued by spending 1968 in the highlands of Papua New Guinea.

After post-doctoral experience at St. Thomas’s Hospital in London (1974–75) and McMaster University in Canada (1975–76), he was appointed foundation professor of community medicine at the University of Newcastle (New South Wales) in 1976 and remained there until the end of 1985. Leeder played a role in the development of innovative medical curriculum, and was foundation director of the Asian and Pacific Centre for Clinical Epidemiology. The Rockefeller Foundation awarded a grant to the University of Newcastle to establish the centre as part of the International Clinical Epidemiology Network (INCLEN) to develop clinical epidemiologists in the Asia-Pacific region. Leeder was the director of a department of community medicine from 1986 to 1996. In Newcastle, his research interests were cardiovascular disease, asthma and tobacco.

Leeder became Professor of Community Medicine at Westmead Hospital in western Sydney in 1986, and pursued research in heart disease and health promotion. His chair was originally in the Department of Community Medicine at the University of Sydney and then in the Department of Public Health and Community Medicine, which became the Sydney School of Public Health.

After serving for two years as head of the Department of Public Health and Community Medicine at the University of Sydney, Leeder was dean of the Medical Faculty from 1996 to 2002. He oversaw the implementation of a new graduate educational program, decentralization of the Faculty to its schools, strategic development of research and the formation of an extensive rural-education network for medical students.

Leeder worked at Columbia University's Earth Institute and Mailman School of Public Health in 2003-04 and developed a report, based on research data and scientific interpretation, of the economic consequences of cardiovascular disease (CVD) in developing economies. The report, "A Race against Time: the challenge of cardiovascular disease in developing economies", focussed on the macroeconomic consequences of CVD—particularly on the fact that one-third of CVD deaths in many developing countries were occurring in people of working age.

After returning from New York in 2004, Leeder directed the development of the Sydney node of the Menzies Centre for Health Policy from 2006 to 2012. He was appointed an officer in the Order of Australia in 2004.

Leeder was chair of the Western Sydney Local Health Board from 2011 until 2016, and his career in western Sydney began in 1986.  Redevelopment of facilities in the health district are underway. An advocate for integrating care in the community with hospital services, he has advised federal and state governments.

He was editor-in-chief of The Medical Journal of Australia (MJA) from January 2013 to May 2015. On 1 May 2015, it was learned that Leeder had been fired by the board of the Australasian Medical Publishing Company (AMPCo, the journal's publisher). Publishing and some editorial functions were to be outsourced to Elsevier, an international publishing company. As more information became available, the AMPCo board had apparently rejected Leeder's advice (on behalf of the MJA editorial staff) and not considered public concerns about Elsevier's business practices. Most of the editorial advisory committee and two deputy editors resigned in protest.

Leeder has served on the University of Sydney Senate for several terms, had two double terms as national president of the Public Health Association, and one triennium as chair of the Health Advisory Committee of the NHMRC. He was a member of the Better Health Commission in development health goals and targets for Australia, the Scientific Advisory Committee and the Health and Hospitals Fund Advisory Board, directed the Western Sydney Local Health District's Research Network and chaired the New South Wales Advisory Committee on Prevention. Leeder was a member of the NSW Health Ministerial Advisory Committee from 2011 to 2014, and chaired the NSW State Committee of the Royal Australasian College of Physicians in 2012 and 2013. He has been a medical journalist for forty years in mainstream media, medical newspapers and on television.

Personal life 
Leeder lives in Sydney, and is married to Dr. Katharine Esson. He has three children: Nicholas, Robert and James. Leeder maintains a blog of his poetry.

References

External links
 Stephen Leeder at the Sydney Medical School
Stephen Leeder at The Conversation

1941 births
Living people
Australian medical researchers
Australian medical writers
Medical journal editors
Officers of the Order of Australia
Sydney Medical School alumni